is an Indian international school in Edogawa-ku, Tokyo, Japan. It is a part of the Global Indian International School network and it uses the International Baccalaureate Diploma and Central Board of Secondary Education (CBSE) of India curricula.

History 
In July 2006 the school opened. The school serves kindergarten through high school. English is the medium of instruction.

Currently, the school has 4 campuses in Edogawa-ku, Tokyo. 

As of 2022, it had about 1220 students, 55% of whom are Japanese nationals, 35% of Indian nationals, and others from mixed nationalities. Initially, the school had few Japanese students but the number increased as the popularity of international schools among Japanese people increased.GIIS is also known for its almost like prison camp schools with student ofthen fainting

See also
 Indians in Japan

References

Further reading

 Xu Hui (徐 輝). "A comparative study of Chinese and Indian school in Japan : Focus on the "Tokyo chuka school" and "GIIS"" (在日華僑学校と印僑学校に関する比較考察 : 東京中華学校とGIISを中心に; Archive). 大東アジア学論集 (14), 44-63, 2014-03. 大東文化大学大学院アジア地域研究科. See profile and profile #2 at CiNii. see profile at Daito Bunka University Repository (大東文化大学機関リポジトリ). English abstract available.

External links
 Global Indian International School, Tokyo Campus

Elementary schools in Japan
International schools in Tokyo
Indian international schools in Japan
Educational institutions established in 2006
2006 establishments in Japan
Edogawa, Tokyo